Vasily Onufrievich Kipriyanov, a librarian, was at the head of the "Civil Publishing House" under the general supervision of Jacob Bruce. It was the first Russian private publishing house (established by the special order of Peter I of May 30, 1705).

Year of birth missing
Year of death missing
Russian publishers (people)
Russian printers